Henri Lucien Doucet (23 August 1856 – 31 December 1895) was a French figure and portrait painter and pastellist, born in Paris.

Biography 
Doucet studied under Lefebvre and Boulanger, and in 1880 won the Prix de Rome. In 1888, he taught at Académie Julian  His pictures are usually piquant, sparkling representations of modern life, eminently Parisian in style, but the audacious realism of his earlier work is not maintained in his later, which is somewhat characterless.  His portraits in pastel are also notable.

His most widely known picture is Après le bal (After the Ball, 1889).  Other excellent examples are the portraits of Celestine Galli-Marie as Carmen (1884, Marseille Museum), La princesse Mathilde Laetitia Wilhelmine Bonaparte and My Parents (1890, Lyons Museum), A Spanish Woman (Pontoise Museum), and Nude Figure (1890).  He was awarded a first-class medal for pastel in 1889 and the Legion of Honour in 1891.

His painting A Skating Party, of 1893, was exhibited at the Chicago World Fair or the World's Columbian Exposition, which was held from May to October 1893 in Chicago in honour of the 400th anniversary of Columbus' discovery of the New World. Goupil made a limited edition first impression photogravure of the painting.

Pupils
Doucet's students included:

 Jules Benoit-Lévy
 William Henry Drake (painter), (1856-1926) American painter and illustrator

References

External links

Doucet at Art Renewal Center
List of works (French)
 

1856 births
1895 deaths
Prix de Rome for painting
Painters from Paris
Academic staff of the Académie Julian
Recipients of the Legion of Honour
19th-century French painters
French male painters
19th-century French male artists